Marko Martin (born 20 August in Tallinn, 1975) is an Estonian pianist trained at the Guildhall School of Music and Drama, teaching at the Estonian Academy of Music and Theatre. He is a member of the Association of Estonian Professional Musicians and the Eduard Tubin Society.

Selective Competition Record 
 1994 Eurovision Young Musicians - Finalist
 1998 Gina Bachauer International Piano Competition - 4th prize
 2000 Honens IPC - 2nd prize

Other prizes 
 2005 Neeme Järvi Young Musicians Award

References

  Estonian Music Information Centre
  Association of Estonian Professional Musicians
  Norfold Symphony Orchestra
  David Oistrakh Festival, Pärnu

Estonian classical pianists
1975 births
Living people
Tallinn Music High School alumni
Eurovision Young Musicians Finalists
Musicians from Tallinn
Estonian Academy of Music and Theatre alumni
20th-century Estonian musicians
21st-century Estonian musicians
21st-century classical pianists